Franz Reiner (born 26 November 1912, date of death unknown) was a Swiss sprint canoer who competed in the late 1940s. During the 1948 Summer Olympics in London, he was eliminated in the heats of the K-2 1000 m event.

References

1912 births
Canoeists at the 1948 Summer Olympics
Olympic canoeists of Switzerland
Year of death missing
Swiss male canoeists